Barry J. Fetterman (c. 1940 – July 26, 1998) was an American football coach. He was the head coach at Kutztown University of Pennsylvania from 1988 to 1992, where he accumulated a record of 18–32–1.

Prior to that, Fetterman served as a head coach at several Pennsylvania high schools and as an assistant at Susquehanna University and Lehigh University.  He was a member of the 1977 Lehigh Engineers football team that won the NCAA Division II Football Championship.

Head coaching record

College

References

1940s births
1998 deaths
Delaware Fightin' Blue Hens football players
Kutztown Golden Bears football coaches
Lehigh Mountain Hawks football coaches
Susquehanna River Hawks football coaches
High school football coaches in Pennsylvania
People from Montgomery County, Pennsylvania